Patrick Cannone (born August 9, 1986) is an American former professional ice hockey player who played in the National Hockey League (NHL) with the Minnesota Wild.

Playing career
Born in Bayport, New York, Cannone played junior hockey for the New England Jr. Falcons of the Eastern Junior Hockey League (EJHL) from 2004 through 2006. He then joined the Cedar Rapids RoughRiders of the United States Hockey League (USHL) for one season before enrolling at Miami University, where he played four seasons of college hockey. In 2011, after the end of the college hockey season, Cannone was signed as a free agent by the Ottawa Senators of the National Hockey League, and was assigned to their Binghamton affiliate in the AHL. On July 8, 2013, Cannone was traded to the St. Louis Blues for future considerations.

After three seasons with the Blues' AHL affiliate, the Chicago Wolves, Cannone left as a free agent to sign a one-year, two-way deal with the Minnesota Wild on July 1, 2016.

Cannone played two seasons within the Wild organization before departing as a free agent following the 2017–18 season. On July 19, 2018, he agreed to his first contract abroad in signing a one-year deal with German club, ERC Ingolstadt of the DEL. As an Alternate captain, Cannone appeared in every game for the 2018–19 season, notching 38 points in 52 games, before opting to leave the club at the conclusion of the post-season.

On May 27, 2019, Cannone signed a one-year contract to continue in the DEL, agreeing to terms with the Schwenninger Wild Wings. He made 51 regular season appearances with the Wild Wings, collecting 10 goals and 35 points, before the playoffs were cancelled due to the COVID-19 pandemic. 

As a free agent, Cannone returned to North America after two seasons abroad, signing his first contract in the third tier ECHL with the Utah Grizzlies on December 17, 2020.

Career statistics

References

External links
 

1986 births
Living people
American men's ice hockey forwards
Binghamton Senators players
Cedar Rapids RoughRiders players
Chicago Wolves players
ERC Ingolstadt players
Ice hockey players from New York (state)
Iowa Wild players
Miami RedHawks men's ice hockey players
Minnesota Wild players
People from Bayport, New York
Schwenninger Wild Wings players
Undrafted National Hockey League players
Utah Grizzlies (ECHL) players